The STM 500 is a Turkish mini submarine of the 500-tonne class under construction since 2022. The shallow-water diesel-electric submarine is being built by Turkish Defense Company STM with completion of the first vessel not expected until 2026.

, the customer for the project had not yet been publicly released.

History 
The STM-500 was announced in 2021 at the 10th Naval Systems Seminar in August 2021 as a lower cost and more cost effective subsurface warfare option.  Construction began in 2022.  It is expected to require four years to complete construction, and up to six years to fully complete the project.

Description 
The STM-500 will displace approximately 500 tonnes, have a crew of 18, and be able to transport a squad of 6 special forces personnel.  It is being designed to have an endurance of 30 days and a maximum dive depth of 250 meters.

Specifications
Specifications as of 2022 include:
 Displacement: 485 tonnes surfaced, 540 tonnes submerged
 Length:    Beam: 
 Speed:  cruise   max
 Endurance  on diesel power  on batteries
 Propulsion power: 
 Power generation: 2x diesel generator with Lithium-ion battery storage

Weapons include up to eight "modern heavy-weight torpedos or guided missiles, delivered via four torpedo tubes. Torpedoes can be fired simultaneously. The sub will be able to carry and launch underwater drones.

See also
Reis-class submarine
MILDEN submarine project

References 

Submarines of Turkey